Senel Paz (born 1950) is a Cuban author and screenwriter.

He was born in Fomento, Sancti Spíritus. He is best known for his short story The Wolf, the Forest and the New Man, for which he was awarded the Juan Rulfo Prize and which he subsequently adapted into the screenplay for Tomas Gutierrez Alea's celebrated movie Strawberry and Chocolate (1994).

References

1950 births
Living people
Cuban writers